National Paralegal College (NPC) is a private for-profit online college headquartered in Phoenix, Arizona and focused on legal education. It is accredited by the Distance Education Accrediting Commission.

History
National Paralegal College was founded in 2002 by Director Mark Geller, Esq., founder of Legal Data Systems, Inc. and school President Avi Katz. Its first class was delivered on June 2, 2003. The school introduced a synchronous learning format to online schooling by running a real time audio/visual online platform to deliver instruction. Initially employing only four staff members and serving fewer than ten students at the time of its initial class in 2003, as of 2020, NPC employs a large faculty and staff and serves more than 1,200 students.

Academics
NPC offers a paralegal certificate and Associate degree in paralegal studies and a Bachelor's degree in legal studies or business administration. All students must satisfy the four core courses, which are Torts & Personal Injury, Contracts, Professional Responsibility & Legal Ethics and Legal Research, Writing & Civil Litigation.

A paralegal certificate requires 24 credits, all of which must be earned by taking paralegal courses. An associate degree requires 60 credits, of which at least 36 credits must be earned through paralegal courses. A Bachelor's Degree required 120 credits, of which at least 45 credits must be earned through paralegal courses. Both degrees require that at least 25% of the credits be earned through "general education" courses. NPC offers general education courses in the fields of business, accounting, finance, writing, mathematics, social sciences, etc.

NPC, through its graduate division, National Juris University, also offers master's degrees in legal studies, taxation and compliance law.

Content delivery
National Paralegal College educational courses are offered via synchronous learning. Each course includes twice-weekly live audio-visual classes using the Adobe Connect platform. In addition, all 100 level NPC paralegal courses utilize custom written online textbooks on a variety of subjects, including torts, contracts, criminal law, constitutional law, wills and estates, domestic relations, etc. These resources are also made available to the public and have been cited by numerous organizations, including the National Association of Catholic Chaplains, religioustolerance.org and the Massachusetts Trial Course law libraries website.

Other content made publicly available includes a series of legal analyses of the news prepared and delivered by National Paralegal College faculty.

Accreditation and agreements
NPC maintains a number of licenses, memberships, accreditation and agreements:

LawShelf Educational Media

In 2018, NPC launched LawShelf Educational Media to provide educational resources in law and law-related areas to the public. LawShelf's "Foundations of Law" section features hundreds of articles in law-related areas complete with examples and self-quizzes. LawShelf's "short videos" section includes about 200 5-10 minute videos on disparate legal topics. It also features 70 "video-courses," which are in-depth courses on law-related areas. Each completed video-course (including passage of a final exam) results in the awarding of a digital badge for display on resumes, portfolios or LinkedIn.

References

External links
 Official website

Online colleges
Universities and colleges in Phoenix, Arizona
Private universities and colleges in Arizona
For-profit universities and colleges in the United States
Educational institutions established in 2002
2002 establishments in Arizona
Distance education institutions based in the United States
Distance Education Accreditation Commission